Artur Gegamovych Danielyan (born 9 February 1998) is a professional footballer who plays as a defender for Greek Super League 2 club Panserraikos. Born in Ukraine, he has represented Armenia at youth level.

Club career
Danielyan is the product of the FC Molod Poltava sportive school system. He spent a large part of his career as a player in two clubs of the Ukrainian Premier League Reserves.

He made his debut in the Ukrainian Premier League, playing as a substituted player in the main-squad team in a match of FC Stal against FC Chornomorets Odesa on 14 May 2016.
In November 2017, at only 19 years old, he was elected Man Of The Match in a game against Shakhtar Donetsk that ended with a 1-1 draw. Profootball.ua wrote: "One of the main contributors to Stal's success was Artur Danielyan. He stood out with a selfless and sacrificed performance, making no mistake against the champions, that helped his team draw one point from the game."

On 7 January 2021, Danielyan left Ararat-Armenia mutual consent.

International career 

He was called up to the Armenia national under-17 football team and made his debut in the match against Belarus national under-17 football team on 25 June 2014. He's also had a few call ups and two caps for the Armenia national under-19 football team.

Honours

Club
Ararat-Armenia
 Armenian Premier League (2): 2018–19, 2019–20
 Armenian Supercup (1): 2019

References

External links
 
 

1998 births
Living people
Armenian footballers
Armenia under-21 international footballers
Armenia youth international footballers
Ukrainian footballers
Ukrainian people of Armenian descent
Citizens of Armenia through descent
FC Metalurh Donetsk players
FC Stal Kamianske players
FC Ararat-Armenia players
FC Ararat Yerevan players
Panserraikos F.C. players
Ukrainian Premier League players
Armenian Premier League players
Association football defenders
Sportspeople from Poltava Oblast